Ervin Cseh (23 March 1838 – 12 June 1918) was a Hungarian politician from Slavonia, who served as Minister without portfolio of Croatian Affairs twice: between 1898–1903 and between 1903–1905. As leader of  Srijem County he succeeded to reconcile the Serbs and the Croatians. He was a representative in the Croatian Parliament beside his ministry. At the time of Mozaffar al-Din Shah Qajar, the Persian shah's visit in Budapest besides many people he was also favoured with the Order of the Lion and the Sun. Cseh also hold his position in the next government, but he had to leave when Kálmán Széll resigned in 1903. After Károly Khuen-Héderváry's unsuccessful forming of a government he returned to the ministerial seat. In 1905 he retired from the politics.

References
 Magyar Életrajzi Lexikon

1838 births
1918 deaths
People from Valpovo
Ministers of Croatian Affairs of Hungary